"Crippled Inside" is a song by English rock musician John Lennon from his 1971 album Imagine.

Background
Lennon recorded "Crippled Inside" on 26 May 1971 at Ascot Sound Studios, during the sessions for his Imagine album. Robert Christgau believed its "good-time ricky-tick" rhythm lent the song a "folk-rock in disguise" identity.

The melody of the song's bridge is very similar to the 1964 Koerner, Ray & Glover rendition of the traditional song "Black Dog".

Covers

The jam band Widespread Panic covered the song a number of times during their Summer 2007 Tour, with the band contributing a version to the benefit album Instant Karma: The Amnesty International Campaign to Save Darfur.

The song was performed on the US television show The Voice by Blake Shelton and his team, in April 2017.

Personnel
John Lennon – vocals, electric guitar
George Harrison – dobro
Nicky Hopkins – tack piano
Ted Turner – acoustic guitar
 Rod Linton – acoustic guitar
John Tout – piano (incorrectly credited as playing "acoustic guitar")
Klaus Voormann – upright bass
 Steve Brendell – upright bass
Alan White – drums

References 

John Lennon songs
1971 songs
Songs written by John Lennon
Song recordings produced by John Lennon
Song recordings produced by Phil Spector
Song recordings produced by Yoko Ono